Mohamed Abdullahi Omaar is a Somali politician and diplomat. He twice served as the Foreign Minister of Somalia.

Biography
He is the elder son of businessman Abdullahi Omaar. He also has three younger siblings: one of his sisters, Raqiya Omaar, is a human rights advocate, and his younger brother Rageh Omaar is a journalist. Omaar belongs to a prominent family of the Sa'ad Musa sub-division of the Habr Awal Isaaq clan. His family was based in Hargeisa.

Omaar was educated at a boarding school in Dorset before graduating from Trinity College, Oxford University.

Political career
Omaar served as one of the Foreign Ministers of Somalia, having been appointed to the office on February 20, 2009 by then Prime Minister, Omar Abdirashid Ali Sharmarke.

After working in various other governmental posts, on November 12, 2010, Omaar was re-appointed Foreign Minister in addition to one of several Deputy Prime Ministers by the new Somali Premier, Mohamed Abdullahi Mohamed.

Starting August 2011, Mohamed Mohamud Ibrahim served as Omaar's Deputy Foreign Minister.

Following a cabinet reshuffle in February 2012, Abdullahi Haji Hassan succeeded Omaar as the new Foreign Minister.

Puntland and Qatar supported Dr. Omaar’s bid to become Prime Minister of Somalia in late 2013.

See also
Rageh Omaar

References

J. Ferguson, The World's Most Dangerous Place: Inside the Outlaw State of Somalia, p. 83

Living people
Foreign Ministers of Somalia
Government ministers of Somalia
Alumni of the University of Oxford
1952 births